The New Indianola Historic District is a historic district in the Weinland Park and Indianola Terrace neighborhoods in Columbus, Ohio's University District. The site was listed on the National Register of Historic Places in 1985 and the Columbus Register of Historic Properties in 1987.

The district was platted in 1916, and all but two of its structures were built by 1921 (as of 1987). Most are two-story houses with brick exteriors, many with porches.

See also
 National Register of Historic Places listings in Columbus, Ohio

References

External links
 

National Register of Historic Places in Columbus, Ohio
Historic districts on the National Register of Historic Places in Ohio
1985 establishments in Ohio
Columbus Register properties
Historic districts in Columbus, Ohio